Naa Bangaaru Talli is a 2013 Indian Telugu-language social problem film written and directed by Rajesh Touchriver. Based on a real-life story, the film stars Siddique, Anjali Patil, Lakshmi Menon, Neena Kurup, and Rathna Shekar. The film is co-produced by M. S. Rajesh and Sunitha Krishnan, an internationally known anti-trafficking crusader. It explores the consequences of sex trafficking, testing the vulnerability of trust in human relations. The film is simultaneously produced in Malayalam as Ente.

The film is released worldwide on 21 November 2014 with public funding. It received highly positive reviews, with awards such as Best Film at the Detroit Trinity International Film Festival. At the 61st National Film Awards, Na Bangaaru Talli won three awards including the award for Best Feature Film in Telugu.

Plot 
Srinivas is a social worker from Amalapuram. His daughter Durga is a studious girl who constantly performs well in her academics. She is also active in protesting about atrocities against women. Srinivas is proud of his daughter. Srinivas frequently visits Hyderabad on the pretext of work. Nobody knows what he does. After completing her Intermediate with flying colors, Durga wishes to go to Hyderabad for her further education. Srinivas initially opposes her decision, claiming that Hyderabad is unsafe, and tries to convince her to study in a nearby town, but when she persists, he reluctantly agrees.

Srinivas travels to Hyderabad along with his daughter and they take accommodation in a hotel. Srinivas receives a phone call from someone and he immediately leaves after cautioning his daughter. It is revealed that Srinivas is actually a broker who lures innocent girls into flesh trade. A woman who was once deceived by Srinivas wants to get revenge, so she kidnaps his daughter. Srinivas gets shocked after finding that Durga is missing from the hotel and starts frantically searching wherever he knows, but in vain.

Durga tries her best to escape, but she is forced into prostitution. One day, she is taken to a costly resort for a wealthy businessman. There, she attacks the businessman, and the same woman who kidnapped her helps her run away. Coincidentally, Durga is spotted by her fiancé who, even without knowing anything, helps her escape and takes her back to their village. A dejected Srinivas returns home without his daughter. Disgusted by the fact that her father is a broker, Durga spits on his face. Realizing that his actions are unpardonable, Srinivas commits suicide.

Cast 
 Siddique as Srinivas
 Anjali Patil as Durga
 Ratna Sekhar Reddy as Durga's Fiancé
 Neena Kurup as Durga's mother
 Lakshmi Menon as Padma

Music

Awards
 National Film Awards (2014)
 Best Feature Film in Telugu - Na Bangaaru Talli
 Best Background Score - Shantanu Moitra
 Special Mention - Anjali Patil

Nandi Awards (2013)
Nandi Award for Best Feature Film (silver) - Sunitha Krishnan
Nandi Award for Best Actress - Anjali Patil
Nandi Special Jury Award - Siddique

 Trinity International Film Festival (2013)
 Best Feature Film - Naa Bangaaru Talli

Official Selections
Indonesian Film Festival (2013)
Beijing International Film Festival (2014)
Myrtle Beach International Film Festival (2014)
Asia Pacific Screen Awards (2014)
Indian Film Festival of Ireland (2014)
20th Kolkata International Film Festival (2014)

Critical reception
Review site 123telugu.com mentioned that "Naa Bangaaru Talli is a film straight from the heart. It opens your eyes and shows the harsh realities of life quite convincingly. Anjali Patil’s performance and some thrilling moments stand out. All those who want to see films with a message and sensibility need to definitely give this film a shot." Since this is a serious issue based film, the site didn't rate the movie in a commercial format.
A reviewer at HOURDOSE mentioned "Overall ‘Naa Bangaaru Talli’ is one of the very few Telugu films that touched a delicate point in the recent times and yet made sure that it's an interesting watch to the theatrical audiences. You can surely give it a shot if you are interested in some meaningful movies which make some sense."

References

External links

Films about human trafficking in India
2013 films
Indian multilingual films
2010s Malayalam-language films
2010s Telugu-language films
Films scored by Shantanu Moitra
Films about rape in India
Films about prostitution in India
Films about child prostitution
Films about women in India
Best Telugu Feature Film National Film Award winners
2013 multilingual films